The Kiln is a novel by William McIlvanney, first published in 1996.

Plot
The Kiln is a sequel to Docherty and follows the life of the same family two generations later.

Awards
1996 - Saltire Society Scottish Book of the Year Award

References

1996 British novels
Scottish novels
Sequel novels
Novels by William McIlvanney
Family saga novels
Hodder & Stoughton books